The WZ-523 (NATO reporting name M1984) is a six-wheeled Chinese armored personnel carrier designed to be amphibious. Built on the chassis of the Hanyang HY472 truck, it can carry a crew of three and seat up to eight additional passengers. Two primary models were produced—one with a roof-mounted 12.7mm heavy machine gun, and the other with a small turret armed with a 35mm grenade launcher and a 7.62mm co-axial general purpose machine gun. An export model that entered service in 2008 as a fire support vehicle was also marketed successfully to the Namibian Army; this is armed with a 73mm 2A28 Grom smoothbore cannon in exactly the same turret as used on the Soviet BMP-1 infantry fighting vehicle.

The WZ-523 was unveiled at a military parade in Beijing in October 1984, gaining the NATO designation M1984, although it was destined for export and did not enter large scale service with the People's Liberation Army (PLA). An internal security vehicle based on the WZ-523, the ZFB-91, which has a turret armed with a 35 mm grenade launcher and a 7.62 mm machine gun replacing the roof mounted 12.7 mm anti-aircraft machine gun of the WZ-523, is in service with PLA units in Hong Kong and Macau.

Development History
When the WZ-523 was first exhibited publicly, there were many observations by international defence analysts regarding its design origins. Although the hull design resembled that of the South African Sandock-Austral Ratel infantry fighting vehicle, subsequent studies have found that while there may have been some South African influence the WZ-523 has many unique characteristics in overall dimensions and technical features. For example, its driving compartment is somewhat reminiscent of the BTR-60, with a single passenger seated next to the driver. The location of the turret ring is also similar that of the BTR-60 series rather than the Ratel, being located near the hull center.

The People's Liberation Army has deployed the WZ-523 primarily for reconnaissance purposes, and for specialized tasks involving artillery and combat support units. Despite being designed as an armored personnel carrier, it was not adopted by Chinese mechanized or motorized infantry forces.

Outside of China, Sudan's Military Industry Corporation also produces the WZ-523 under license.

Specifications
WZ-523s have relatively good range and payload, and may seat up to ten passengers who enter and debus from a single door in the rear hull. The vehicle has a long, boat-shaped hull with a trim vane mounted on the glacis plate. It is fully amphibious once this vane is raised, being propelled at speeds of up to 7 km by two water jets at the rear. A two-piece windscreen is provided for the driver and a passenger seated to his right. During combat, the windscreen may be covered by hinged armored shutters.

Export models of the WZ-523 are offered with a variety of turreted armament options, including a 12.7mm machine gun and a one-man conical turret incorporating a single 7.62mm general-purpose machine gun to the right and a heavier armament of the customer's choice to the left.

WZ-523s in Nigerien and Gabonese service have been re-engined with German Deutz BF6 diesel motors.

Variants

WZ-523 Armored Personnel Carrier armed with a 12.7 mm heavy machine gun.
ZFB-91 Internal Security Vehicle based on the WZ-523.

Operators

: 60 in service, not including ZFB91 variant.
: 10
: 20
: 3
: 58 delivered in 2009-2010; 4 ambulance version delivered in 2012 and 24 others in 2013.
: 21; export model incorporating the BMP-1 turret.
: 2
: produced under license as the Shareef 2.

See also

Vehicles of comparable role, performance, and era
WZ551
Ratel
EE-11 Urutu
SIBMAS
Pindad Anoa
Berliet VXB-170

References

 Foss, Christopher F. Jane's Tanks and Combat Vehicles Recognition Guide. London: HarperCollins, 2002. .

Amphibious armoured personnel carriers
Armoured fighting vehicles of the People's Republic of China
Internal security vehicles
Wheeled armoured personnel carriers
Six-wheeled vehicles
Military equipment introduced in the 1980s
Wheeled amphibious armoured fighting vehicles